Raghunath Rao Narsappa Malkapure is an Indian politician who is the current member of the Karnataka Legislative Council from Bidar Constituency and also present Pro-tem Chairman of Karnataka Legislative council.

He also served as State President,Bharatiya Janata Yuva Morcha.

References

Bharatiya Janata Party politicians from Karnataka
Living people
Members of the Karnataka Legislative Council
1958 births